1848 is a 1949 French short documentary film directed by Marguerite de la Mure and Victoria Mercanton and starring Bernard Blier. The film explains the French Revolution of 1848. Bernard Blier's narration is supported by pictures once drawn by contemporary artists including Honoré Daumier.

1848 was nominated for an Academy Award for Best Documentary Short. The Academy Film Archive preserved 1848 in 2010.

References

External links

1848 in France
1949 films
1949 documentary films
1949 short films
Black-and-white documentary films
French short documentary films
French black-and-white films
1940s short documentary films
Documentary films about revolutions
Documentary films about royalty
Films set in 1848
1940s English-language films
1940s French films